The 2015 Rakuten Japan Open Tennis Championships was a men's tennis tournament played on outdoor hard courts. It was the 42nd edition of the Japan Open, and part of the 500 Series of the 2015 ATP World Tour. It was held at the Ariake Coliseum in Tokyo, Japan, from October 5–11, 2015.

Points and prize money

Point distribution

Prize money

Singles main-draw entrants

Seeds

 1 Rankings are as of September 28, 2015.

Other entrants
The following players received wildcards into the singles main draw:
  Tatsuma Ito
  Yoshihito Nishioka
  Yasutaka Uchiyama

The following players received entry from the qualifying draw:
  Matthew Ebden
  Austin Krajicek
  Donald Young
  Mikhail Youzhny

Withdrawals
Before the tournament
  Pablo Andújar →replaced by Sam Groth
  Ernests Gulbis →replaced by Marcos Baghdatis
  Gaël Monfils →replaced by Albert Ramos Viñolas

Retirements
  Sam Groth (foot injury)
  Bernard Tomic (illness)

Doubles main-draw entrants

Seeds

 Rankings are as of September 28, 2015

Other entrants
The following pairs received wildcards into the doubles main draw:
  Austin Krajicek /  Yasutaka Uchiyama
  Toshihide Matsui /  Jarkko Nieminen

The following pair received entry from the qualifying draw:
  Steve Johnson /  Sam Querrey

The following pair received entry as lucky losers:
  Andre Begemann /  Artem Sitak

Withdrawals
Before the tournament
 Kevin Anderson (right knee injury)

Finals

Singles

 Stan Wawrinka defeated  Benoît Paire, 6–2, 6–4

Doubles

  Raven Klaasen /  Marcelo Melo defeated  Juan Sebastián Cabal /  Robert Farah, 7–6(7–5) , 3–6, [10–7]

References

External links 
Official website

Rakuten Japan Open Tennis Championships
Japan Open (tennis)
Rakuten Japan Open Tennis Championships
Rakuten Japan Open Tennis Championships